Bury Me Alive may refer to:

"Bury Me Alive" (song), a 2010 song by We Are the Fallen
Bury Me Alive (album), a 2009 album by Inhale Exhale